Mission: Impossible – Rogue Nation is a 2015 American action spy film written and directed by Christopher McQuarrie from a story by McQuarrie and Drew Pearce. It is the sequel to Mission: Impossible – Ghost Protocol (2011) and is the fifth installment in the Mission: Impossible film series. The film stars Tom Cruise in the main role, Jeremy Renner, Simon Pegg, Ving Rhames, Rebecca Ferguson, Sean Harris, and Alec Baldwin. In Mission: Impossible – Rogue Nation, Ethan Hunt (Cruise) and his team are on the run from the Central Intelligence Agency following the disbandment of the Impossible Missions Force (IMF) and must go to war with the Syndicate, an international black ops terrorist organization composed of rogue government agents from all over the world.

McQuarrie, who completed uncredited rewrites for Mission: Impossible – Ghost Protocol, was announced as the director of Mission: Impossible – Rogue Nation in August 2013. The returns of Cruise, Renner, Pegg, and Rhames were confirmed by July 2014 while the screenplay was also developed by Pearce and Will Staples; it was ultimately solely credited to McQuarrie. Ferguson, Harris, and Baldwin rounded out the cast that October. Principal photography began in August 2014 and lasted until March 2015, with filming locations including Vienna, Casablanca, London, and at Leavesden Studios in Hertfordshire. The film's official title was revealed in March 2015.

Originally scheduled for worldwide release on December 25, 2015, Mission: Impossible – Rogue Nation premiered at the Vienna State Opera on July 23, 2015, was theatrically released in the United States by Paramount Pictures a week later. The film received positive reviews from critics, with praise for the action sequences, cast performances (particularly Cruise and Ferguson's), screenplay, and McQuarrie's direction. It grossed $683 million worldwide, becoming the eighth-highest-grossing film of 2015 and the then-second-highest grossing film in the franchise. The  sequel, Mission: Impossible – Fallout, was released in 2018.

Plot

IMF Agent Ethan Hunt intercepts a shipment of nerve gas being moved by the Syndicate, a consortium of rogue field operatives from various intelligence agencies that Ethan has been tracking. Later, at an IMF station in London, Ethan's debrief is from the Syndicate itself, indicating it has compromised him and the IMF. While being gassed unconscious, he is forced to watch the station operative killed by a blonde man wearing glasses. 

In Washington D.C., CIA Director Alan Hunley, suspicious of the Syndicate's existence, convinces a Senate committee to disband and assimilate the IMF into the CIA due to its involvement in recent events. Ex-IMF agents Benji Dunn and William Brandt begin working for the CIA under strict scrutiny and security. Ethan awakes and escapes a torture chamber led by ex-KGB agent Janik Vinter, a.k.a the Bone Doctor, with the help of a mysterious woman, later revealed to be disavowed MI6 Agent Ilsa Faust, now undercover with the Syndicate. Six months later, Hunt, who is a fugitive from CIA, lures a Special Activities Division team to Havana as a means to pass information about the Syndicate to Benji, who later receives tickets to Turandot, performed by the Vienna State Opera. On Benji's arrival in Vienna Ethan asks him to help track the blonde man. 

Instead, they find Faust and several other Syndicate assassins there to kill the Austrian Chancellor. Ethan prevents the initial hit and escapes with Faust, only to witness the Chancellor killed by a car bomb. As Syndicate agents chase them, Ethan and Benji are forced to leave Faust to protect her cover. Hunley blames Ethan and Benji for the death of the chancellor and orders the Special Activities Division to execute them. Brandt convinces former Agent Luther Stickell to find Ethan before the CIA does. Ethan and Benji find Faust in Casablanca, where she identifies Ethan's suspect as rogue MI6 Agent Solomon Lane. They break into a secure building and acquire a digital ledger stolen from Lane that contains the names of the Syndicate operatives. Faust flees with the data to London and meets her handler, MI6 Chief Atlee, who discreetly wipes it. 

Later, Benji and Ethan are found by Stickell and Brandt. Benji made a copy of the file, and Stickell discovers that the data is an encrypted British government virtual red box that requires the Prime Minister's biometrics to unlock. They travel to London, but Lane's men abduct Benji during the team's meet with Faust at Waterloo and use him to blackmail Ethan into decrypting and delivering the data to him. Despite Brandt's protests, Ethan accepts the mission. A worried Brandt secretly reveals their location to Hunley. Hunley, Brandt, and Atlee meet the PM in Oxford, who confirms that the Syndicate was a project proposed by Atlee to perform missions without oversight, which the PM rejected. Atlee reveals himself as Ethan in a mask; he and Brandt secure the PM's biometrics, allowing Stickell to decrypt the file. When the real Atlee arrives, Ethan forces him to admit that he surreptitiously started the Syndicate before it was hijacked by Lane. 

The file is revealed not as a list of Syndicate operatives but actually access to £2.4 billion in numerous accounts. Ethan destroys the data after deducing that Lane plans to fund the Syndicate with the money. At his meeting with  Lane, Ethan finds Benji, strapped to a bomb, and Faust. Ethan tells Lane that he has memorized the data and offers himself in exchange for Benji. Benji escapes after the bomb is disarmed, while Ethan and Faust are chased by Vinter's men. Faust kills Vinter while Lane, who pursues Ethan, is lured into a glass cell and is gassed unconscious like Ethan was in the beginning. Having witnessed the IMF's success, Hunley returns to the Senate committee and claims that their previous meeting served as a pretext to help Ethan expose and shut down the Syndicate as a new mission, convincing the committee to restore the IMF. After the meeting, Brandt welcomes Hunley as the new IMF Secretary.

Cast
 Tom Cruise as Ethan Hunt, an agent of the Impossible Mission Force (IMF) and protagonist of the film.
 Jeremy Renner as William Brandt, an IMF Agent and intelligence analyst transferred to the CIA after the IMF was disbanded. 
 Simon Pegg as Benji Dunn, an IMF technical field agent who is transferred to the CIA's cyber operations division after the IMF was disbanded.
 Rebecca Ferguson as Ilsa Faust, a disavowed MI6 Agent undercover in the Syndicate who saves Ethan's life.
 Ving Rhames as Luther Stickell, an IMF Agent and computer hacker, who retired after  the IMF was disbanded. He returns back after Brandt calls him for help to find Hunt.
 Sean Harris as Solomon Lane, an ex-MI6 Agent who went rogue and became the leader of the Syndicate, a terrorist organization.
 Simon McBurney as Atlee, the founder of the Syndicate and MI6 Director.
 Zhang Jingchu as Lauren, a CIA analyst.
 Tom Hollander as The Prime Minister of United Kingdom.
 Jens Hultén as Janik 'Bone Doctor' Vinter, an ex-KGB Agent turned Syndicate operative and Lane's second-in-command.
 Alec Baldwin as Alan Hunley, the Director of the CIA, later the new IMF secretary.
Hermione Corfield as an IMF agent working at the record shop in London who is killed by Lane.

Robert Maaser plays Richter, a KSA agent turned Syndicate operative assigned to kill Ilsa if she fails to kill the Chancellor. Wolfgang Steigmann plays Kagan, a Mossad agent turned Syndicate operative who fights Hunt at the Vienna State Opera. Alec Utgoff appears as the crewman of the A400 cargo plane carrying the nerve gas. Mateo Rufino and Fernando Abadie appear as low level Chechen separatists piloting the A400, while Rupert Wickham appears as the Austrian chancellor.

Production

Pre-production
Paramount Pictures announced in August 2013 that Christopher McQuarrie would direct the fifth Mission: Impossible film, from a script by Drew Pearce, with Tom Cruise reprising his role as Ethan Hunt. TC Productions and Bad Robot would produce, and Skydance Productions, who served as co-financers and executive producers of the latest installment, will work closely with the team in the development and production process." On November 14, 2013, Paramount announced a release date of December 25, 2015. The same month, Simon Pegg confirmed he would reprise his role as Benji. In May 2014, Will Staples replaced Pearce as screenwriter. Also that month, Jeremy Renner confirmed he was returning in the role of William Brandt, and Cruise said the film would shoot in London, with a later report saying it would first shoot in Vienna in August. At some point, McQuarrie replaced Staples as screenwriter; the final credits list McQuarrie as screenwriter, with story by Pearce.

In July 2014, Rebecca Ferguson was cast and Alec Baldwin was in talks for the film. Baldwin was confirmed to have joined the cast in August 2014, and Ving Rhames was confirmed to be reprising his role of Luther Stickell. On September 5, it was announced that Sean Harris was in negotiations for the villain role. On October 2, Simon McBurney joined the cast of the film. On October 6, Chinese actress Zhang Jingchu joined the film's cast (she only appears for 30 seconds in the finished film). On March 22, 2015, Paramount revealed the film's official title, Mission: Impossible – Rogue Nation, along with a teaser poster and trailer.

Filming

Principal photography began in August 2014. On August 21, the production released its first photos from the set in Vienna, Austria. In August actors Cruise and Pegg, along with director Christopher McQuarrie, were in Vienna, at the Metro and on the roof-top of Vienna State Opera. After finishing one-and-a-half weeks of filming in Austria, on August 30, Cruise arrived in the Moroccan capital city of Rabat for filming more scenes. Here the Marrakesh Highway was closed for fourteen days (August 30–September 12). Other filming locations in Morocco include Agadir, Rabat and Casablanca. On September 8 and 9, filming took place in the Marrakesh Stadium, which was closed both days for filming purposes, and Kasbah of the Udayas, in Rabat.

After more than a month of shooting in Austria and Morocco, filming moved to London on September 28. Filming of an action scene featuring Ethan Hunt climbing and hanging on the outside of a flying Airbus A400M Atlas took place at RAF Wittering near Stamford. To pull off this particular stunt, the production team were given a limited period of only 48 hours. The plane took off and landed 8 times before they had the perfect shot. On November 9, filming began on Southampton Water, and Fawley Power Station. Tom Cruise trained under diving specialist Kirk Krack to be able to hold his breath for three minutes to perform an underwater sequence which was filmed in a single long take without any edits (though the scene in the movie was cut with several breaks, giving the impression for the scene having several takes). However, stunt coordinator Wade Eastwood claims that Cruise held his breath for just over six minutes.

Some footage also took place at Leavesden Studios in the UK, with the crew spending a month filming footage in Leavesden’s underwater tank. The tank was approximately forty feet in length, and circular tracks were constructed around its drive bays in order to attach the camera and dolly. Other footage shot at Leavesden included additional insert shots, shots of Cruise running through grass which were filmed using a Technocrane, and several crowd shots. On February 20, 2015, The Hollywood Reporter said filming was halted to give McQuarrie, Cruise, and an unknown third person time to rework the film's ending. Filming ended on March 12, 2015.

Music

The musical score for Mission: Impossible – Rogue Nation was composed by Joe Kraemer, who previously collaborated with director McQuarrie on The Way of the Gun and Jack Reacher. Kraemer was announced as the composer for the film in September 2014. The soundtrack was recorded with small orchestral sections at British Grove Studios and with full orchestra at Abbey Road Studios.

As well as incorporating Lalo Schifrin's thematic material from the television series throughout the score, three tracks ("Escape to Danger", "A Matter of Going", and "Finale and Curtain Call") interpolate Puccini's Nessun dorma aria from his opera Turandot, featured in the opera house scene.
The physical soundtrack became available from La-La Land Records on July 28, 2015, with the digital album released from Paramount Music on the same day.

Release
Paramount had originally scheduled the film for a December 25, 2015 release. On January 26, 2015, Paramount advanced the release date to July 31, 2015. The main reason cited by The Hollywood Reporter was to avoid competition with two other 2015 films, Star Wars: The Force Awakens and Spectre. In the United States and Canada, it was released in the Dolby Vision format in Dolby Cinema, the first-ever time for Paramount. On February 13, 2015, Paramount and IMAX Corporation announced that they would digitally remaster the film into the IMAX format and release it in IMAX theaters worldwide on the scheduled date. The film was completed at 2:00AM on July 18, 2015, less than two weeks before its release date. The film was officially released in North America on July 31, 2015. Lotte released the film in South Korea on July 30, 2015. The film was released in China on September 8, 2015.

In August 2015, Fox Networks acquired the US cable broadcast rights, for broadcast after its theatrical release. The film is available for FX Networks and its suite of networks: FX, FXX, FXM, as well as the video-on-demand platform FXNow.

Marketing
Paramount Pictures spent $42 million on advertising for the film.

A comic book was released in conjunction with the film's DVD/Blu-ray release. It follows Hunt going rogue during the events of the film. The comic is written by the film's writer and director Christopher McQuarrie and illustrated by Lazarus artist Owen Freeman.

Reception

Box office
Mission: Impossible – Rogue Nation grossed $195 million in the U.S. and Canada, and $487.7 million in other countries, for a worldwide total of $682.7 million. Although Rogue Nation was projected to become the highest-grossing Mission: Impossible film and the biggest movie for Cruise, it apparently fell short of eclipsing Mission: Impossible – Ghost Protocols final gross to become the third-highest-grossing Mission: Impossible film and the third-biggest film for Cruise. It had a worldwide opening of $121 million and an IMAX worldwide opening total of $12.5 million (the third-biggest of July behind The Dark Knight Rises (2012) and Harry Potter and the Deathly Hallows – Part 2 (2011)). Deadline Hollywood calculated the net profit of the film to be $108.9 million, when factoring together all expenses and revenues for the film.

United States and Canada
In the United States and Canada, according to pre-release tracking, the film was projected to earn around $40–50 million in its opening weekend, less than what the first three Mission: Impossible films earned in their initial weekend. It made $4 million from its Thursday night showings which began at 8 p.m. from 2,764 theaters, and $20.3 million on its opening day, which is the second-biggest opening day for Cruise (behind War of the Worlds) and the biggest in the Mission: Impossible franchise (breaking Mission: Impossible 2s record), with 16% of ticket sales from the film's 367 IMAX theaters. In its opening weekend the film grossed $55.5 million exceeding expectations and is the second-highest opening in the franchise, behind Mission: Impossible 2 ($57.8 million) and the third-biggest for Cruise behind War of the Worlds ($64.8 million) and Mission: Impossible 2. IMAX contributed $8.4 million of the total opening gross from 369 IMAX screens which is the third-best for a July opening after The Dark Knight Rises ($19 million) and Harry Potter and the Deathly Hallows – Part 2 ($15.2 million). Premium large format grossed up $2.6 million, 13% of Friday's gross with Cinemark XD grossing close to $700,000 at 108 screens. It remained at the top spot for the second weekend earning an estimated $28.5 million (down 48.7%) from 3,988 theaters (32+ theaters) buoyed by strong word of mouth, rapturous reviews and strong plays at IMAX theaters. Revenues from IMAX also dropped steadily by 39% to $4.3 million in its second weekend. It topped the North American box office for two consecutive weekends until surpassed by the music biographical drama Straight Outta Compton in its third weekend. It ended its theatrical run on October 29, 2015, playing in theaters for a total of 91 days, or 13 weeks, earning a total of $195 million at the North American box office which is just 28.6% of its total worldwide gross. It is the fourth-highest-grossing Mission: Impossible film behind Mission: Impossible Fallout ($220 million), Mission: Impossible 2 ($215 million) and Mission: Impossible – Ghost Protocol ($209 million).

Other countries
Elsewhere, the film opened in 40 international markets including 135 IMAX theaters on July 31, 2015 in big markets such the United Kingdom, Mexico, and Australia. It grossed $64.5 million in its opening weekend and went No. 1 in 33 markets and IMAX contributed $4.1 million of its international opening. Revenues from its second weekend increased by 0.5% to $65 million. It added 18 new markets including India, Japan, and Russia and opened at No. 1 in 17 of the 18 markets with the exception of Japan where it was behind Jurassic World. Overall, it opened at No. 1 in 55 of the 63 territories it has been released in and had the biggest opening weekend ever for the franchise in 46 markets and Cruise's best opening in 40 markets. It topped the box office outside of North America for three consecutive weekends before being overtaken by Paramount's own Terminator Genisys in its fourth weekend and four in total.

It had the biggest opening for the franchise in the UK, Ireland and Malta ($8.3 million), France ($7 million), India ($7.5 million), Japan ($6.1 million), Russia and the CIS ($5.3 million), Mexico ($5 million), the Middle East ($4.7; including $2.5 million from UAE alone), Taiwan ($5.1 million), Australia ($3.8 million), Germany ($3.2 million), Brazil ($3.1 million) and Pakistan ($1 million). In South Korea, where the franchise has been a hit it opened to $16.95 million (49% above Ghost Protocol), which is the second-biggest opening ever for Paramount, behind Transformers: Dark of the Moon; Cruise's biggest-ever opening; the best for the Mission: Impossible franchise; and the second-biggest opening for a Western film of 2015. It added $8.1 and $3.7 million in its second and third weekend for a total of $41.1 million making South Korea the film's second-highest market followed by Japan ($41.2 million), the United Kingdom ($32 million), France ($20.9 million), and Germany ($13 million). In Japan, it faced competition with the continued run of Jurassic World. In China, Rogue Nation emerged very successful and earned $18.5 million on its opening day of September 8 (including $1.4 million from midnight screenings), which is the country's biggest opening for a Hollywood 2D film, the second-biggest for any 2D film in China (only behind the $22.2 million debut of local 2D film Pancake Man), and the fifth-biggest opening for any film. Despite opening on a Tuesday—during which most children are off to school—the film opened successfully and almost matched the opening figure of North America. Rob Cain of Forbes cited out possible reasons for the successful opening: the well-establishment of the franchise in China (its immediate predecessor Ghost Protocol earned $102.7 million), rapid expansion and growth of Chinese movie market, being the second Hollywood movie (after Terminator Genisys) to be released after the nearly 60-day blackout period in which non-Chinese movies were dabarred from going to general release in the country, and the successful awareness campaign and marketing efforts by the team including Tom Cruise visiting several Chinese cities. It went on to earn an estimated $85.8 million through its opening weekend (Tuesday–Sunday) from 5,500 screens. It is the highest-grossing 2D Hollywood film there with $136.8 million (breaking Interstellar's record). Rogue Nation was projected to make roughly 70% of its worldwide gross abroad, and indeed ended up making $487,287,762 or 71.4% of its entire worldwide gross overseas which is the second highest among the series.

Critical response
On the review aggregator Rotten Tomatoes, Mission: Impossible – Rogue Nation has a rating of 94% based on 325 reviews and an average rating of 7.50/10. The website's critical consensus reads, "Mission: Impossible Rogue Nation continues the franchise's thrilling resurgence—and proves that Tom Cruise remains an action star without equal." Metacritic gives the film a score of 75 out of 100 based on 46 critics, indicating "generally favorable reviews". Audiences surveyed by CinemaScore gave the film a grade of "A−" on an A+ to F scale.

Ty Burr of The Boston Globe called the film "preposterously enjoyable" and said that it "unfolds with fluid, twisty, old-school pleasure," highlighting the performances of Cruise, Pegg, Ferguson, and Baldwin and comparing the action scenes to those of the James Bond films as well as Alfred Hitchcock's The Man Who Knew Too Much (1956). He ultimately gave the film 3 out of 4 stars. Richard Roeper of the Chicago Sun-Times gave Rogue Nation 3.5 out of 4 stars, highly praising the film's cast and stating that the film "keeps topping itself". However, he criticized the villain for not being too memorable or intimidating. Kenneth Turan of the Los Angeles Times said that McQuarrie's direction allowed Rogue Nation to stand out among the other films in terms of action and its inclusion of female characters, singling out Ferguson's Ilsa as uniquely empowered and action-oriented, also praising her scenes with Cruise. Christopher Orr of The Atlantic praised Cruise, saying "You overcome the impossible through the application of sheer, unvarnished willpower, a quality that Cruise has always possessed in abundance" and describing him as the driving force of the film and the franchise. He, too, praised Ferguson among the supporting cast for her role as an action heroine. Joseph Wigler of MTV.com considered the movie as "one of the most entertaining Ethan Hunt adventures" which proves that "the franchise still has plenty of fight left in it, with no signs of slowing down." He praised the performances of Cruise and Ferguson, applauding the latter for playing "the most fascinating character in the entire movie" and "one of the most complicated and alluring characters in the entire five film series." Manohla Dargis of The New York Times stated "Sleek and bloated, specific and generic, 'Rogue Nation' is pretty much like most of the 'Impossible' movies in that it's an immense machine that Mr. McQuarrie, after tinkering and oiling, has cranked up again and set humming with twists and turns, global trotting and gadgets, a crack supporting cast and a hard-working star."

A. A. Dowd of The A.V. Club remarked, "Rather than go full auteur on his formulaic material, McQuarrie instead offers a kind of greatest-hits package: 'Rogue Nation' marries the shifting loyalties of Brian De Palma's original to the kinetic action beats of John Woo's series nadir and the all-set-piece structure of Brad Bird's series zenith, adding an omnipotent villain not far removed from the one Philip Seymour Hoffman played in J.J. Abrams' entry. It's the least visually or conceptually distinctive of the five movies, leaning on what's worked before rather than forging its own path." Chris Nashawaty of Entertainment Weekly gave the film a B+, calling it "breathlessly thrilling" and giving high praise to its action sequences, saying " all you can do is pick your jaw off your lap and grin at the breathtakingly bananas spectacle you've just witnessed." Meanwhile, David Edelstein of Vulture.com called Ferguson the "best reason" to see the film. However, he felt it did not surpass its predecessor and singled out several elements of some of the action sequences for criticism. Joe Morgenstern of The Wall Street Journal also praised Ferguson but felt that she and Cruise had "zero chemistry" onscreen. Nonetheless, he praised the film for working "ingenious changes on old tropes". Daniel Krupa of IGN only gave the film a score of 7/10, praising the action sequences and the performances of the central cast but criticizing it for not adding enough to the series or expanding on the plot of Ghost Protocol.

Home media
Mission Impossible: Rogue Nation was released on Blu-ray and DVD on December 15, 2015 in the United States. A 4K Ultra HD Blu-ray was released on June 26, 2018 along with the first four films.

Accolades

Sequel

By May 2015, Paramount was developing a sixth Mission: Impossible film, with Cruise, Abrams, Ellison, and Goldberg returning to produce, along with Don Granger and Matt Grimm executive producing, and Elizabeth Raposo overseeing development. Christopher McQuarrie returned to write and direct the film, which began filming April 2017 for a July 2018 release.

References

External links

 
 

Mission: Impossible (film series)
2015 films
2015 action thriller films
2010s heist films
2010s spy action films
American spy action films
American action thriller films
American heist films
American sequel films
2010s English-language films
Films about the Central Intelligence Agency
Films about the Secret Intelligence Service
Films about terrorism
Films based on television series
Films set in Casablanca
Films set in Havana
Films set in Kuala Lumpur
Films set in Langley, Virginia
Films set in London
Films set in Minsk
Films set in Morocco
Films set in Oxfordshire
Films set in Paris
Films set in Vienna
Films set in Virginia
Films set in Washington, D.C.
Films shot at Warner Bros. Studios, Leavesden
Films shot in Austria
Films shot in Monaco
Films shot in Morocco
Films shot in Vienna
IMAX films
Alibaba Pictures films
Bad Robot Productions films
Paramount Pictures films
Skydance Media films
Films directed by Christopher McQuarrie
Films produced by J. J. Abrams
Films produced by Tom Cruise
Films with screenplays by Christopher McQuarrie
Films with screenplays by Drew Pearce
Films scored by Joe Kraemer
2010s American films